Danijel Miškić (born 11 October 1993) is a Croatian football central midfielder who plays in Russia for Ural Yekaterinburg.

Career
Miškić started off in the Croatia Sesvete academy before moving to the Dinamo Zagreb academy where he spent 6 season moving up the ranks. A youth international, he was then sent to the Druga HNL subsidiary Radnik Sesvete on loan in 2011, remaining there for two seasons. Moving to Lokomotiva in the summer on 2013, he made his Prva HNL debut on 22 July 2013, coming in the 70th minute of the 2–1 away win against Osijek for Filip Mrzljak. That, however, remained his only cap for the team, and he moved the following winter to Celje in the Slovenian PrvaLiga. On 25 July 2016, he joined Olimpija Ljubljana and signed a three-year contract.

On 7 August 2018, Olimpija announced the transfer of Miškić to the Russian Premier League club FC Orenburg.

On 13 August 2020, he moved to another Russian Premier League club Ural Yekaterinburg.

Career statistics

References

External links
 
Danijel Miškić at NZS 

1993 births
Sportspeople from Novo Mesto
Living people
Association football midfielders
Croatian footballers
Croatia youth international footballers
GNK Dinamo Zagreb players
NK Sesvete players
NK Lokomotiva Zagreb players
NK Celje players
NK Olimpija Ljubljana (2005) players
FC Orenburg players
FC Ural Yekaterinburg players
First Football League (Croatia) players
Croatian Football League players
Slovenian PrvaLiga players
Russian Premier League players
Croatian expatriate footballers
Expatriate footballers in Slovenia
Croatian expatriate sportspeople in Slovenia
Expatriate footballers in Russia
Croatian expatriate sportspeople in Russia